Marina Vlady (born 10 May 1938) is a French actress.

Biography
Vlady was born in Clichy, Hauts-de-Seine to White Russian immigrant parents. Her father was an opera singer and her mother was a dancer. Her sisters, now all deceased, were the actresses Odile Versois, Hélène Vallier and Olga Baïdar-Poliakoff. The sisters began acting as children and, for a while, pursued a ballet career.

From 1955 to 1959, she was married to actor/director Robert Hossein. From 1963 to 1966, she was married to Jean-Claude Brouillet, a French entrepreneur, owner of two airlines and member of French Resistance. Vlady was married to Soviet poet/songwriter Vladimir Vysotsky from 1969 until his death in 1980. She lived with French oncologist Léon Schwartzenberg from the 1980s until his death in 2003.

Vlady won the Best Actress Award at the 1963 Cannes Film Festival for The Conjugal Bed. In 1965, she was a member of the jury at the 4th Moscow International Film Festival.

Vlady starred in Jean-Luc Godard's 2 ou 3 choses que je sais d'elle (1967), and later portrayed the insightful and protective stepmother in the Italian film Il sapore del grano (aka: The Flavor of Corn) (1986). A rare English language role was as Kate Percy in Orson Welles' Chimes at Midnight (1966). Her television credits include the 1983 mini-series La Chambre des Dames.

She wrote Vladimir, or the Aborted Flight, a memoir of her relationship with Vladimir Vysotsky.

For a decade, the couple maintained a long-distance relationship as Marina compromised her career in France in order to spend more time in Moscow, and his friends pulled strings for him to travel abroad. She eventually joined the Communist Party of France, which essentially gave her an unlimited-entry visa into the Soviet Union, and provided Vysotsky with some immunity against prosecution by the government. The problems of his long-distance relationship with Vlady inspired several of Vysotsky's songs.

Politics
In 1971, Vlady signed the Manifesto of the 343, which publicly declared she had an abortion as a way to advocate for reproductive rights, even though the procedure was illegal in France at the time.

Vlady and partner Léon Schwartzenberg participated in the protests against deportations of Arab workers from France. She accepted a role in a film about a gay couple from Iran.

She is also continuing her career, both as a writer and as an actress. Among others, she has published a book on the Soviet invasion of Afghanistan, a topic that was close to Vysotsky's heart. Vlady has continued acting on stage. She also came out with a one-woman show based on her book about Vysotsky.

Filmography
Film

Songs
Marina Vlady and Vladimir Vysotsky (1996) [CD], Melodiya, songs by Marina Vladi, words and music by Vladimir Vysotsky

References

External links

Marina Vlady at Cinémathèque française

French film actresses
French television actresses
1938 births
Living people
French expatriates in the Soviet Union
French people of Russian descent
People from Clichy, Hauts-de-Seine
Vladimir Vysotsky
20th-century French actresses
20th-century Russian women singers
20th-century Russian singers
Cannes Film Festival Award for Best Actress winners
Recipients of the Medal of Pushkin
Commandeurs of the Ordre des Arts et des Lettres
Signatories of the 1971 Manifesto of the 343